Elham is a unisex name derived from the Arabic name Ilham which means "inspiration". Different spellings include İlham or İlhami in Turkic languages. Ellie is used as a shortened form of Elham. The name Elham may refer to:
Elham Al Qasim (born 1982), Emirati explorer
Elham Aminzadeh (born 1964), Iranian politician
Elham Asghari (born 1981), Iranian swimmer
Elham Hamidi (born 1977), Iranian actress
Elham Kazemi, Iranian–American mathematics educator
Elham Manea (born 1966), Yemeni writer
Elham Shaheen (born 1961), Egyptian actress
Elham Yaghoubian (born 1972), Iranian writer

See also
Ilham

References

Persian given names